Players and pairs who neither have high enough rankings nor receive wild cards may participate in a qualifying tournament held one week before the annual Wimbledon Tennis Championships.

Seeds

  Lyudmyla Kichenok /  Nadiia Kichenok (qualified)
  Yuliya Beygelzimer /  Klaudia Jans-Ignacik (qualifying competition, lucky losers)
  Chan Chin-wei /  Xu Yifan (qualifying competition)
  Monique Adamczak /  Olivia Rogowska (first round)
  Jarmila Gajdošová /  Arina Rodionova (qualified)
  Mandy Minella /  Alexandra Panova (first round)
  Mariana Duque Mariño /  María Irigoyen (first round)
  Stéphanie Foretz Gacon /  Tamarine Tanasugarn (first round)

Qualifiers

  Lyudmyla Kichenok /  Nadiia Kichenok
  Jarmila Gajdošová /  Arina Rodionova
  Pauline Parmentier /  Laura Thorpe
  Vesna Dolonc /  Daniela Seguel

Lucky losers
  Yuliya Beygelzimer /  Klaudia Jans-Ignacik

Qualifying draw

First qualifier

Second qualifier

Third qualifier

Fourth qualifier

External links

2014 Wimbledon Championships on WTAtennis.com
2014 Wimbledon Championships – Women's draws and results at the International Tennis Federation

Women's Doubles Qualifying
Wimbledon Championship by year – Women's doubles qualifying
Wimbledon Championships